Baydary is a rural locality (a village) in Cherdynsky District, Perm Krai, Russia. The population was 6 as of 2010.

Geography 
Baydary is located 23 km south of Cherdyn (the district's administrative centre) by road. Bolshaya Anikovskaya is the nearest rural locality.

References 

Rural localities in Cherdynsky District